Sylvia Baldessarini (born 13 June 1971 in Zams) is an Austrian sport shooter. She competed in rifle shooting events at the 1988 Summer Olympics.

Olympic results

References

1971 births
Living people
ISSF rifle shooters
Austrian female sport shooters
Shooters at the 1988 Summer Olympics
Olympic shooters of Austria
People from Zams
Sportspeople from Tyrol (state)
20th-century Austrian women